The 2008 NCAA Division I Field Hockey Championship was the 28th women's collegiate field hockey tournament organized by the National Collegiate Athletic Association, to determine the top college field hockey team in the United States. The Maryland Terrapins won their sixth championship, defeating the Wake Forest Demon Deacons in the final. The semifinals and championship were hosted by the University of Louisville at Trager Stadium in Louisville, Kentucky.

Bracket

References 

2008
Field Hockey
2008 in women's field hockey
Sports competitions in Louisville, Kentucky
2008 in sports in Kentucky